The 2019 season was the 98th in the Cruzeiro Esporte Clube's existence. Along with the Campeonato Brasileiro Série A, the club also competed in the Campeonato Mineiro, the Copa do Brasil and the Copa Libertadores.

After a strong start to the season – which included a 21-game unbeaten streak, a solid performance in the Copa Libertadores group stage and a Campeonato Mineiro title over city rivals Atlético Mineiro –, Cruzeiro were largely appointed as major contenders for the 2019 national and international competitions titles. However, the team had a sharp drop in yeld from May, causing them to fight against relegation since the early rounds of the Campeonato Brasileiro Série A.

On 26 May, corruption and mismanagement scandals involving the Cruzeiro's board were revealed by the Rede Globo program Fantástico, causing huge repercussions inside and outside the club. Police investigations, financial difficulties and political unstability would be a constant throughout the year at Cruzeiro, leading to a devastating crisis that ended up affecting the team's performance on the pitch.

On 30 July, Cruzeiro were knocked out of Copa Libertadores on penalties to River Plate in the round of 16 stage, after a 0–0 tie on aggregate.

On 7 August, following a run of bad results – having the team won just 1 of 18 matches –, Cruzeiro announced the departure of manager Mano Menezes, ending a more than three years spell in the club. Four days later, Rogério Ceni was announced as the new team's manager.

On 4 September, the club were eliminated by Internacional in the Copa do Brasil semi-finals, losing 4–0 on aggregate.

Rogério Ceni was sacked on 26 September, after just 8 games in charge. Disagreements with squad members and lack of support from the club board were cited as the main causes for dismissal. On 27 September, Abel Braga was appointed as the new team's manager.

Incapable of improving the team's performance, Abel Braga left Cruzeiro on 29 November, having achieved only 3 wins in 14 games. On the same day, Adilson Batista was announced as the manager for the last three rounds of the championship, taking the team in 17th position in the table.

In financial, technical and political collapse, Cruzeiro were relegated to Campeonato Brasileiro Série B for the first time in their history on 8 December, after a 2–0 loss to Palmeiras at Mineirão.

Competitions

Overview

Campeonato Mineiro

First stage

Knockout phase

Quarter-final

Semi-finals

Final

Campeonato Brasileiro Série A 

League play paused for one month between rounds 9 and 10 for the 2019 Copa América hosted in Brazil.

League table

Results by round

Matches

Copa do Brasil 

As Cruzeiro participated in the 2019 Copa Libertadores, the club entered the Copa do Brasil in the round of 16, whose draw was held on 2 May.

Round of 16

Quarter-finals

Semi-finals

Copa Libertadores 

The group stage draw for the 2019 Copa Libertadores was made on 17 December 2018. Cruzeiro were drawn into Group B with Emelec, Huracán and Deportivo Lara.

Group stage

Knockout stage

Round of 16 
The draw for the knockout stages of the Copa Libertadores was held on 13 May.

References

External links 
 Cruzeiro Esporte Clube
 Cruzeiro official website (in Portuguese)

Brazilian football clubs 2019 season
2019 Cruzeiro Esporte Clube season